Can't Anybody Here Play This Game? is a book written by journalist Jimmy Breslin, about the 1962 New York Mets. The book chronicles the first season of the Mets, an expansion team that lost many games. The title of the book came from a remark made by Mets manager Casey Stengel expressing his frustration over the team's spectacular ineptitude.

See also
1962 New York Mets season

References

1963 non-fiction books
1962 Major League Baseball season
Major League Baseball books
New York Mets
Viking Press books